Jacob Florentin Andersen (born 26 January 2004) is a Danish footballer who plays as a centre-back for the U-19 squad of Danish Superliga club AGF.

Career

AGF
Born in Galten, Andersen joined AGF at the age of nine. Shortly after he turned 17, Andersen began playing with AGF's U-19 team. Andersen did well with the U19s, which earned him his professional debut on 24 May 2021 in the Danish Superliga against FC Midtjylland, where he came on from the bench, playing the last 11 minutes of the game.

In June 2021, Andersen signed a youth contract with AGF. In February 2023, Andersen signed his first professional contract with AGF; a deal until June 2025 and which also included that from summer 2023 he would become a permanent part of the first team squad.

References

External links

Jacob Andersen at DBU

2004 births
Living people
Danish men's footballers
Association football defenders
Denmark youth international footballers
Danish Superliga players
Aarhus Gymnastikforening players